Philippe Boucher (born March 24, 1973) is a Canadian former professional ice hockey defenceman who played in the National Hockey League. He was the general manager of the Drummondville Voltigeurs of the QMJHL from 2019 to 2023.  He also served as GM with the Quebec Remparts and the Rimouski Oceanic.

Playing career

Amateur
As a youth, Boucher played in the 1985, 1986 and 1987 Quebec International Pee-Wee Hockey Tournaments with minor ice hockey team from Lotbinière, Quebec and Rive-Sud.

Boucher began his junior ice hockey career with the Quebec Major Junior Hockey League's Granby Bisons in 1990. Boucher enjoyed immense success in his first season, producing at a nearly point-per-game average and winning the QMJHL Rookie of the Year award. He was also named a second-team QMJHL All-Star. His second season came with just as much success, as Boucher notched 77 points in 65 games with Granby and the Laval Titan, once again being named a second-team All-Star. Boucher spent one more seasons in the QMJHL, splitting time between Granby, Laval, and later two professional teams.

Professional
The Buffalo Sabres drafted Boucher in the first round, 13th overall, in the 1991 NHL Entry Draft. A year later, Boucher would begin his professional career, starting the 1992–1993 season as a defenceman for the Sabres. Despite some solid outings, and even a game where Boucher posted a +5 plus/minus rating, Boucher ended the season with the Rochester Americans of the American Hockey League. After three somewhat disappointing seasons with the Sabres, Boucher was dealt to the Los Angeles Kings during the 1994–1995 season.

In Los Angeles, Boucher produced better numbers, but still proved unreliable to finish a complete 80+ game season in the NHL. Criticisms aimed at Boucher also claimed he was not as defensively reliable or physical as other professional defencemen his size. Even so, Boucher was a consistent blueliner for the Kings for eight seasons, and played a career-high 80 games in the 2001–2002 season.

In 2002, Boucher signed as a free agent with the Dallas Stars, reuniting with the former special teams coach of the Kings, Dave Tippett.

On November 28, 2003, late in the third period of a game against the New Jersey Devils, an errant puck hit Boucher on the left side of his face, breaking his left orbital bone. Boucher had surgery on December 1 to repair the bone, putting him on the injured list for weeks. Since the injury, Boucher has worn a visor.

In the 2006–07 NHL season, Boucher had a break-out year, tying the Stars' franchise record for most goals by a defenceman in a regular season, with 19 goals. Boucher was selected by the NHL to play in the 55th National Hockey League All-Star Game in Dallas on January 24, 2007. Since Scott Niedermayer, one of two defencemen on the starting line-up chosen by the fans, was injured at the time, Western All-Star coach Barry Trotz named Boucher on the starting line-up as Niedermayer's replacement.

During the 2008–09 season on November 16, 2008, Boucher was traded by the Stars to the Pittsburgh Penguins in return for Darryl Sydor.  He helped the Penguins capture the Stanley Cup, his first, before announcing his retirement from the NHL on September 3, 2009.

Personal life
Boucher resides with his wife Lucie and their two children, Matthew and Vanessa in Quebec City during the summer. Boucher founded the Philippe-Boucher Foundation, which helps underprivileged children in the Lotbinière region.

Awards
RDS Cup (QMJHL Rookie of the Year) – 1990–91
OMJHL Second-Team All-Star – 1990–91 and 1991–92
Played in NHL All-Star Game – 2007
Stanley Cup champion – 2009

Career statistics

References

External links 
 

1973 births
Living people
Buffalo Sabres draft picks
Buffalo Sabres players
Canadian ice hockey defencemen
Dallas Stars players
Los Angeles Kings players
Ice hockey people from Quebec
Granby Bisons players
Laval Titan players
Long Beach Ice Dogs (IHL) players
Manitoba Moose (IHL) players
National Hockey League All-Stars
National Hockey League first-round draft picks
People from Montérégie
Pittsburgh Penguins players
Phoenix Roadrunners (IHL) players
Quebec Remparts coaches
Rochester Americans players
Stanley Cup champions
Canadian ice hockey coaches